The Wreck in the North Sea is a 1915 Dutch silent drama film directed by Theo Frenkel.

It is a short romantic silent movie, about a fisherman called Arend who leaves his beloved Marie to fish again in the North Sea for his work. The desperate Jan van der Velde (who secretly loves Marie) has sabotaged Arend's boat before he leaves. It sinks, and Marie never hears of him again. She finds some comfort in Jan's embrace, but later hears of Jan's sabotage. Jan gets arrested, but then comes good news, Arend is still alive and returns into Marie's arms.

Cast
Julie Meijer	... 	Marie
Kees Lageman	... 	Rooseveldt
Wilhelmina Kleij	... 	Mrs. Rooseveldt
Jaap Van der Poll	... 	Arend
Piet Fuchs	        ... 	Jan van der Velde
Coen Hissink	... 	Duiker / Diver
Yard Van Staalduynen	... 	Rechter van instructie / Magistrate
Aaf Bouber	... 	Bruid van Bruinsma / Bride of Bruinsma
Thibault Bigot Jr.		
Willem Faassen		
Frits Fuchs		
Mrs. Kloppenberg		
Jacques van Hoven

External links 
 

1915 films
Dutch silent feature films
Dutch black-and-white films
1915 drama films
Films directed by Theo Frenkel
Dutch drama films
Silent drama films